Robert Henrey (born 26 June 1939) is an Anglo-French former child actor best known for his role as the son of the French ambassador to London in the classic 1948 English film The Fallen Idol, directed by Carol Reed.

Personal
Henrey was the son of Robert Selby Henrey- grandson of Sir Coutts Lindsay, 2nd Baronet- and the memoirist Madeleine Gal.  Gal would go on to write about her son's film career in two of her many volumes of memoirs, the 1948 A Film Star in Belgrave Square and the 1950 A Journey To Vienna.

He went on to study at Downside School and Oxford University, where he obtained a degree in language and literature.

At age 25, Henrey moved to the United States, eventually settling in Greenwich, Connecticut.  He and his wife Lisette Talbert had a son, Edward, a graphic artist and illustrator, and a daughter, Dominique, who died from a food allergy at the age of 18, having suffered all her life from poor health.

Career
Robert Henrey's autobiography, Through Grown-up Eyes: Living with Childhood Fame, was published by Polperro Heritage Press in September 2013. Henrey was interviewed on BBC Radio 4's The Film Programme in December 2015 where he discussed the impact that The Fallen Idol had on his childhood and adult life.

Acting
Henrey was cast in The Fallen Idol based on a photograph of him which appeared on the dustjacket of his father's book A Village in Piccadilly.  Studio head of London Films Alexander Korda passed on the photograph to director Carol Reed, who thought it exactly matched his vision of the character, Philippe, even though the photo had actually been taken in 1942 and showed Henrey when he was three years old. Henrey's parents agreed to let him make the film and a screen test was arranged. But at the time, Henrey, by that time eight years of age, was on holiday at his grandmother's farm in Normandy. So Korda sent a plane over to France to pick him up and fly him to London for the test. Carol Reed liked him at once, especially his liquid French accent, which the part called for. Reed sat down for the first of many talks with Henrey and never saw another child. Henrey was paid £1,000 for his role, with a stipulation that if the film took more than ten weeks to make, he would be paid an extra £100 for every additional week. Because the film took eight months to make, a long time for that era, due to Reed's exacting standards, Henrey eventually earned £5,000. When the film was released, the critics were very impressed with Henrey's performance in the film, with one calling him the greatest kid since Jackie Coogan and Henrey became a star overnight. On the strength of his performance in the film, Henrey was signed to a £30,000 contract by Sir Alexander Korda to make four more films for his company between 1948 and 1952, only one of which, The Wonder Kid, was ever made. This was filmed in late 1949 - early 1950, but not released until 1952. However, it was not a great success, influencing his family's belief that he should return to education.

Financial career
Henrey worked for several years as a tax consulting partner at PriceWaterhouseCoopers in New York City until his retirement in 1997.

The Ministry
Henrey was ordained as a deacon in 1984 and went on to serve as an interfaith chaplain at Greenwich Hospital after his certification in 2001.

References

External links
 Pastoral staff, St. Catherine of Siena Roman Catholic Church
 Lisette and Robert Henrey, 2007, Focus On French Cinema
 "The Queen Meets the Stars," British Pathe newsreel in which Bobby Henrey presents flowers to Queen Elizabeth, wife of George VI, later Queen Mother.
 'Through Grown-up Eyes: Living with Childhood Fame' by Robert Henrey  (hardback) 
 
 
 
 

1939 births
 Alumni of the University of Oxford
 French male child actors
French people of Dutch descent
French people of German-Jewish descent
Living people
People educated at Downside School
People from Villers-sur-Mer
Rothschild family
Schuyler family